KACS (90.5 FM) is the main station signal of a local listener-supported non-commercial independent radio network  broadcasting a Christian format. Licensed to Chehalis, Washington, United States.  The network is currently owned by Chehalis Valley Educational Foundation.

Translators
In addition to the main station, KACS is relayed by KACW 91.3 in South Bend, Washington, and by KBSG 90.1 in Raymond, Washington, as well as additional translators to widen its broadcast area.

References

External links

Chehalis, Washington
ACS